Babys was a figure in Greek mythology. He was the brother of the Phrygian satyr Marsyas who challenged Apollo to a flute-playing contest. Unlike his brother, who owned a double flute, Babys' flute had only one pipe. Perceiving him to be a simpleton who lacked any apparent skill, Athena persuaded Apollo to spare Babys his anger when the god won the competition.

See also
 Aulos

References

Characters in Greek mythology